Johnny Ahlqvist, born 4 July 1948, is a Swedish ombudsman and Social Democratic politician.

Parliamentary career 
Ahlqvist was a member of parliament from 1985 to 2000, elected in the northern and eastern constituencies of Skåne County.

He was primarily active in the labor market committee, as deputy 1985–91, member 1991-94 and chairman 1994–00. He was also a member of the:

 Social Committee, 1988-91
 EU Committee, 1995-2000
 Interparliamentary Delegation, 1994-00
 Parliamentary Election Committee, 1998-00 
 War Delegation, 1994–00

He attended the 2010 wedding of Crown Princess Victoria with Carina Moberg.

References 

1948 births
Living people
Swedish social democrats
Ombudsmen in Sweden